Bag may refer to:
 Bag, Gilan (بگ - Bag)
 Bag, Kohgiluyeh and Boyer-Ahmad (باگ - Bāg)
 Bag, Khash (بگ - Bag), Sistan and Baluchestan Province
 Bag, Qasr-e Qand (بگ - Bag), Sistan and Baluchestan Province
 Bag, Zanjan (بگ - Bag)